The Data General Eclipse line of computers by Data General were 16-bit minicomputers released in early 1974 and sold until 1988. The Eclipse was based on many of the same concepts as the Data General Nova, but included support for virtual memory and multitasking more suitable to the small office than the lab. It was also packaged differently for this reason, in a floor-standing case the size of a small refrigerator. The Eclipse series was supplanted by the 32-bit Data General Eclipse MV/8000 in 1980.

Description
The Data General Nova was intended to outperform the PDP-8 while being less expensive, and in a similar fashion, the Eclipse was meant to compete against the larger PDP-11 computers. It kept the simple register architecture of the Nova but added a stack pointer which the Nova lacked. The stack pointer was added back to the later Nova 3 machines in 1975 and also used on the later 32-bit Data General Eclipse MV/8000. The AOS operating system was quite sophisticated, advanced compared to the PDP-11 offerings, with access control lists (ACLs) for file protection.

Production problems with the Eclipse led to a rash of lawsuits in the late 1970s, after new versions of the machine were pre-ordered by many DG customers and then never arrived. After over a year of waiting, some decided to sue the company, while others simply cancelled their orders and went elsewhere. It appeared that the Eclipse was originally intended to replace the Nova outright, also evidenced by the fact that the Nova 3 series released at the same time was phased out the next year. However, strong continuing demand resulted in the Nova 4, perhaps as a result of the continuing problems with the Eclipse.

Facts 
The original Cray-1 system used an Eclipse to act as a Maintenance and Control Unit (MCU).  It was configured with two Ampex CRTs, an 80 MB Ampex disk drive, a thermal printer, and a 9-track tape drive.  Its primary purpose was to download an image of either the Cray Operating System or customer engineering diagnostics at boot time.  Once booted, it acted as a status and control console via RDOS station software.

References 

Minicomputers
Eclipse
16-bit computers